Mohinder Lal (June 1, 1936 – July 1, 2004) was an Indian hockey player.

References

External links
 

1936 births
2004 deaths
People from Nashik
Field hockey players from Maharashtra
Olympic field hockey players of India
Olympic gold medalists for India
Field hockey players at the 1960 Summer Olympics
Field hockey players at the 1964 Summer Olympics
Indian male field hockey players
Recipients of the Arjuna Award
Olympic medalists in field hockey
Olympic silver medalists for India
Asian Games medalists in field hockey
Field hockey players at the 1966 Asian Games
Medalists at the 1964 Summer Olympics
Medalists at the 1960 Summer Olympics
Asian Games gold medalists for India
Medalists at the 1966 Asian Games